The Assistant Secretary of Defense for Acquisition, or ASD(A) is one of three assistant secretaries reporting to the Under Secretary of Defense for Acquisition and Sustainment. The position is the principal advisor to the Under Secretary of Defense for Acquisition and Sustainment, the Deputy Secretary of Defense, and the Secretary of Defense on matters relating to acquisition program management; the Department of Defense Acquisition System; and the development of strategic, space, intelligence, tactical warfare, command and control, and business systems.

Roles & responsibilities
The Assistant Secretary of Defense for Acquisition's priority, is to deliver a Defense Acquisition System that is flexible, tailorable, and enables speed, and is able to deliver capability at the point of need. Currently, the office is focused on transitioning from an acquisition system that is expensive, slow, and burdensome towards one involving reduced timelines, lower costs, and improved quality.

Organization
The Assistant Secretary of Defense for Acquisition has the following people reporting to them:
Principal Deputy Assistant Secretary of Defense for Acquisition
Deputy Assistant Secretary of Defense for Acquisition Enablers
Deputy Assistant Secretary of Defense for Strategic, Space, and Intelligence Portfolio Management
Deputy Assistant Secretary of Defense for Platform and Weapon Portfolio Management
Executive Director, Joint Rapid Acquisition Cell
Principal Director, Defense Pricing and Contracting
President, Defense Acquisition University
Director, Defense Contract Management Agency

Office holders

Principal Deputy Assistant Secretary

References

Acq
Acq